Harry Herman Clarke (6 October 1885 – 15 April 1961) was an  Australian rules footballer who played with St Kilda in the Victorian Football League (VFL).

Notes

External links 

1885 births
1961 deaths
Australian rules footballers from Victoria (Australia)
St Kilda Football Club players